EDSAC 2 was an early computer (operational in 1958), the successor to the Electronic Delay Storage Automatic Calculator (EDSAC). It was the first computer to have a microprogrammed control unit and a bit-slice hardware architecture.

First calculations were performed on incomplete machine in 1957. Calculations about elliptic curves performed on EDSAC-2 in the early 1960s led to the Birch and Swinnerton-Dyer conjecture, a Millennium Prize Problem, unsolved as of 2022. And in 1963, 
Frederick Vine and Drummond Matthews used EDSAC 2 to generate a seafloor magnetic anomaly map from data collected in the Indian Ocean by H.M.S. Owen, key evidence that helped support Plate Tectonic theory.

References 

Early British computers
One-of-a-kind computers
40-bit computers
University of Cambridge Computer Laboratory
History of Cambridge